Ostorhinchus brevispinis is a species of deep-water cardinalfish. To date it has only been recorded from Rurutu in the Austral Islands and Rangiroa in the Tuamotus although the difficulty in observing and collecting this fish has led the authors who described the species to predict that it is likely to have a far wider distribution.

This species grows to over 60 mm in length with five broad longitudinal brown stripes alternating with five much narrower whitish stripes and a dark mark on the caudal peduncle. The scientific name "brevispinis" refers to the very short first spine on the dorsal fin.

References

brevispinis
Fish described in 2003
Taxa named by Thomas H. Fraser
Taxa named by John Ernest Randall